Robert Doyle (born 14 January 1951) is a former Australian rules footballer who played with South Melbourne in the Victorian Football League (VFL).

Doyle, a ruckman, was a South Melbourne player from under-19 level and made his senior debut in 1969. Also used in key positions, Doyle had his most productive season in 1973 when he played 20 games. Playing as a forward against North Melbourne at Arden Street Oval in 1974, Doyle kicked a career high five goals, but was overshadowed by Sam Kekovich, who kicked 10 majors. He appeared in the opening seven rounds of the 1975 VFL season and then transferred to Port Melbourne to play out the year.

Due to his work, Doyle moved to Adelaide in 1976 and began playing for SANFL club South Adelaide. It was from South Adelaide that his son Stephen would be drafted to the Sydney Swans, as a father-son selection.

References

1951 births
Sydney Swans players
South Adelaide Football Club players
Port Melbourne Football Club players
Australian rules footballers from Victoria (Australia)
Living people